The Mountain Dell Dam provides a water equalizing and storage reservoir for Salt Lake City, Utah located  east of the city in northeastern Salt Lake County, near Interstate 80 in Parley's Canyon.

Designed by John S. Eastwood, and constructed between 1914 and 1925, the dam is an example of a mixed buttress dam and multiple arch dam construction. At the time the plans were made, the city was in need of a sufficient supply of water, especially during late summer and the middle of winter.

The dam was listed on the National Register of Historic Places in 1980.

Mountain Dell Dam is listed as in "poor" condition and is under repair.

Design 

Plans were made for three types of dam:
 Arched solid dam, gravity type
 Reinforced concrete dam of the Ambursen type
 Multiple arch reinforced concrete dam of the Eastwood design

After consideration, the multiple arch type was chosen. One of the factors influencing this decision was the bedrock condition at the site. The bedrock is a calcareous shale not entirely watertight and of a nature to decompose somewhat under exposure to air and water. The advantages of the multiple arch type in this connection were considered to be the practical elimination of upward pressure, the practical impossibility of overturning or sliding on its base and the ready facilities for internal inspection of the dam at any time.

Construction 

The dam as planned and as constructed consists of 11 buttresses and 11 arches in the first stage and an additional 5 buttresses and 5 arches in the second stage. The arch rings are 120 degree arcs of circles. The two sets of outlet gates each consist of two  pipes with a suitable grating entrance, and with a butterfly and a double-disc gate valve on each pipe.

The total quantity of concrete in the dam is 8,271 cubic yards (6,323 m³). The total cost of the dam was $90,000. The general design and supervision was handled under the direction of Sylvester Q. Cannon, City Engineer of Salt Lake City and John S. Eastwood acting as consulting engineer. Parrott Bros. Co. were the contractors.

Condition
As of 2019 Mountain Dell Dam was listed as being in "poor" condition, with increased hazard due to its proximity to highways and parks, with risk to life in the event of failure. A liner is being installed on the upstream face to control water intrusion that creates freeze/thaw damage. Until the deterioration is arrested, the reservoir may only be half full during the winter.

See also
American Water Landmark – (awarded 1981)

References

External links

Industrial buildings and structures on the National Register of Historic Places in Utah
Buttress dams
Arch dams
Dams on the National Register of Historic Places in Utah
Buildings and structures in Salt Lake County, Utah
Dams completed in 1925
United States local public utility dams
Historic American Engineering Record in Utah
Wasatch Range
National Register of Historic Places in Salt Lake County, Utah